The following is a list of first round selections from Canadian College Drafts from 1956 to 1969, which are annual sports drafts in which the teams of the Canadian Football League (CFL) selected eligible Canadian/non-import players, typically from the ranks of Canadian Interuniversity Sport football or NCAA college football. Member clubs made selections based on the reverse order of the previous year's standings, with the team with the worst record being awarded the first selection. Prior to 1956, only Interprovincial Rugby Football Union clubs participated in the draft while the Western Interprovincial Football Union not only chose by territorial rights, but would also try to sign away players that were drafted by eastern clubs. To create a level playing field, the Canadian Football Council was formed which later evolved into the Canadian Football League. Following the creation of the CFC, all nine member clubs participated in the 1956 draft. The order of selection was determined by reverse record with the losing conference picking first.

1956 Canadian College Draft
The 1956 Canadian College Draft took place in the spring of 1956. 34 players were chosen from among eligible players from five eastern universities, McGill University, Queen's University, University of Toronto, University of Western Ontario, and McMaster University.

1957 Canadian College Draft
The 1957 Canadian College Draft took place in the spring of 1957. 35 players were chosen from among eligible players from five eastern universities, McGill University, Queen's University, University of Toronto, University of Western Ontario, and McMaster University.

1958 CFL Draft
The 1958 CFL Draft took place in the spring of 1958. 35 players were chosen from among eligible players from five eastern universities, McGill University, Queen's University, University of Toronto, University of Western Ontario, and McMaster University.

1959 CFL Draft
The 1959 CFL Draft took place in the spring of 1959. 22 players were chosen from among eligible players from five eastern universities, McGill University, Queen's University, University of Toronto, University of Western Ontario, and McMaster University.

1960 CFL Draft
The 1960 CFL Draft took place in the spring of 1960. 24 players were chosen from among eligible players from five eastern universities, McGill University, Queen's University, University of Toronto, University of Western Ontario, and McMaster University. Beginning in 1960, western teams reverted to selecting players based on territorial rights from the university programs in their cities/provinces. Because the University of Calgary did not have a football program at this time, the Calgary Stampeders continued to participate in the draft with the eastern teams.

1961 CFL Draft
The 1961 CFL Draft took place in the spring of 1961. 24 players were chosen from among eligible players from five eastern universities, McGill University, Queen's University, University of Toronto, University of Western Ontario, and McMaster University.

1962 CFL Draft
The 1962 CFL Draft took place in the spring of 1962. 38 players were chosen from among eligible players from five eastern universities, McGill University, Queen's University, University of Toronto, University of Western Ontario, and McMaster University.

1963 CFL Draft
The 1963 CFL Draft took place in the spring of 1963. The draft was expanded to include all nine teams again in 1963 and all players from degree-granting schools in Canada were eligible for the draft. 71 players were chosen from among eligible players from these schools.

1964 CFL Draft
The 1964 CFL Draft took place in the spring of 1964. 58 players were chosen from among eligible players from degree-granting schools in Canada.

1965 CFL Draft
The 1965 CFL Draft took place in the spring of 1965. 60 players were chosen from among eligible players from degree-granting schools in Canada.

1966 CFL Draft
The 1966 CFL Draft took place in the spring of 1966. 63 players were chosen from among eligible players from degree-granting schools in Canada.

1967 CFL Draft
The 1967 CFL Draft took place in the spring of 1967. 44 players were chosen from among eligible players from degree-granting schools in Canada.

1968 CFL Draft
The 1968 CFL Draft took place in the spring of 1968. 73 players were chosen from among eligible players from degree-granting schools in Canada.

1969 CFL Draft
The 1969 CFL Draft took place in the spring of 1969. 67 players were chosen from among eligible players from degree-granting schools in Canada.

References

1956